James Murray (9 April 1895 – 19 January 1974) was an Australian politician who served in both houses of the Parliament of Western Australia, as a member of the Legislative Assembly from 1947 to 1950 and as a member of the Legislative Council from 1951 to 1965. He represented the Liberal Party.

Murray was born in Inverness, Scotland, and attended Inverness High School. He came to Australia as a teenager, and in March 1915 enlisted in the Australian Imperial Force. Murray had reached the rank of lieutenant by the war's end, and in June 1918 was wounded in action while fighting in France. After being discharged from the army, he worked at various timbermills in Western Australia's South West, including as a millhand, clerk, and foreman. Murray re-enlisted in the army in 1940, but was able to remain in Western Australia, working as a training officer and in logistics. He entered politics at the 1947 state election, winning the seat of Bunbury from the Labor Party. However, his time in the Legislative Assembly was short-lived, with Labor's Frank Guthrie reclaiming the seat for his party at the 1950 election. Murray re-entered parliament at a 1951 by-election for South-West Province, having worked as a sawmill manager in the meantime. The by-election had been caused by the death of the sitting member, William Mann. Murray remained in parliament until retiring at the 1965 state election. He died in Perth in January 1974, aged 78.

References

1895 births
1974 deaths
Australian Army officers
Australian military personnel of World War I
Australian Army personnel of World War II
Members of the Western Australian Legislative Assembly
Members of the Western Australian Legislative Council
People educated at Inverness High School
Military personnel from Inverness
Scottish emigrants to Australia
20th-century Australian politicians